Brajkovac is a village situated in Lazarevac municipality, Šumadija District in Serbia.

References

Populated places in Šumadija District
Lazarevac